Mǎmiào (马庙) could refer to:

 Mamiao, Huaining County, town in southwestern Anhui, China
 Mamiao, Jinxiang County, town in Jinxiang County, Shandong, China